WSKV-FM (104.9 FM, "Pickup Country") is a radio station broadcasting a full-service country music format licensed to Stanton, Kentucky, United States.  Pickup Country operates Studios in both Stanton, Kentucky and Irvine, Kentucky. The station is owned by Moore Country 104, LLC.

History
The Federal Communications Commission granted a construction permit to the Red River Gorge Broadcasting Company for a new FM station in Stanton on December 21, 1973. WSKV went on the air August 10, 1974, with a hybrid format of country and pop music.

References

External links

SKV-FMou
Powell County, Kentucky
1974 establishments in Kentucky
Radio stations established in 1974